"Resentment" is a song written by Walter W. Millsap III, Candice Nelson and Curtis Mayfield and originally performed by Victoria Beckham. It is an emotive ballad whose lyrics detail a situation where a woman feels hurt and anger that her man lied and cheated on her. "Resentment" along with several other songs were meant to be on Beckham's solo-album, Come Together (2004), which was later shelved, leading the song to be included on the documentary DVD titled The Real Beckhams (2004). As the album release was shelved.

American singer Jazmine Sullivan re-recorded the song for her unreleased original debut Break My Little Heart (2004), but her album was shelved.

Eventually, American singer Beyoncé was given the song and recorded it in 2006. Beyoncé's version of the song was included on her second studio album B'Day (2006) and featured additional lyrics and an arrangement composed by the singer herself.

Background and development

Victoria worked with Walter M. Millsap III and Candice Nelson on a track titled "Resentment"; recording sessions occurred in 2003. The track used Curtis Mayfield's 1972 "Think (Instrumental)", from the Super Fly soundtrack. "Resentment" was first included on a documentary of Victoria and David Beckham, titled The Real Beckhams (2004). The DVD captures the family as they move to Spain, and features Victoria Beckham launching her newest singles to date. The Sun, noted Victoria Beckham's multiple songs about a possible affair and read into the "poignant lyrics" as a stab at her husband David Beckham. "Resentment" along with "Valentine", "Me And You This Time", and "That Dude" were meant to be on Beckham's solo-album Come Together, which was later shelved, forcing the song to be included exclusively on the documentary DVD.

Beyoncé version

American singer and songwriter Beyoncé recorded "Resentment" for her second studio album, B'Day (2006).  Original version was composed by Walter W. Millsap III and Candice Nelson and contained the instrumental of Curtis Mayfield's "Think" from the film Superfly in 1972.
Beyonce re-arranged the structure of the song by changing the order of lyrics, adding a chorus and writing new lyrics. The song is four minutes and forty-two seconds in length, a major difference from the original version's length of three minutes and twenty seconds.

The cover was well received by music critics who praised Beyoncé's powerful vocal performance and vulnerability. It charted at number 11 on the Billboard Bubbling Under R&B/Hip-Hop Singles based on downloads alone. She performed the song during her revue shows I Am... Yours (2009) and Revel Presents: Beyoncé Live (2012). It was additionally included the 2009 DVD/CD I Am... Yours: An Intimate Performance at Wynn Las Vegas as the ninth track.

Background and composition
The version of "Resentment" on B'Day contained writing and production credits for Beyoncé along with the team who worked on the original version of the song. During an interview with 4Music, the singer talked about the song, saying, "The song on my new album [B'Day] I am  proudest of is probably 'Resentment'. I feel like vocally I've grown, I feel like all the chord changes and the beautiful harmonies and the lyrics is something that I really am proud of".

"Resentment" is a passionate ballad about a gritty, agitated goodbye which adds a "different kind of overwrought drama". The track is written in the key of E major. "Resentment" features a slow groove of 70 beats per minute, with Beyoncé's vocals range spanning from the note of F3 to E5. It is built around a honeyed sample of Curtis Mayfield's Think. In "Resentment" Beyoncé sings about infidelity and a boyfriend who cheats and lies to her, seen in the lines "I've been crying for too long/ What did you do to me?/ You lied, you lied, you lied." In the song, Beyoncé presents a more vulnerable side of herself, because she shows that she doesn't want her boyfriend to leave her for another woman.

Reception

Beyoncé's version of "Resentment" received positive reviews from critics, most of whom noted the soulful vocal stylings used in the song. Bill Lamb of About.com complimented the song as one of the album highlights and described it as "gospel-influenced" and "emotion filled" song. A writer of Billboard magazine stated that Beyoncé "shifts into emotive mode" on this song from "rockier, edgier" sound of album and noted that the track "calls to mind the subtle fervor and passion of the best girl groups of the '60s and '70s". Brian Hiatt from Rolling Stone marked the track as "one of the most arresting moments" on the album and described it as an "anguished, sixties-tinged ballad". Spence Abbott of IGN also noted track as a stand out alongside "Irreplaceable" and observed that "[the] track goes straight for Aretha Franklin-inspired territory, with Beyoncé actually getting gritty and dropping her high octave range down a few pegs to get guttural and downright Old School soulful". Jon Pareles of The New York Times stated that the "agitated goodbye" builds a different kind of overwrought drama. Steve Jones of USA Today the song showcases Beyoncé's "maturing vocal chops," describing the song as spare and gritty. Sal Cinquemani of Slant Magazine noted that the song would have been better if performed by a trio of "talented" vocalists, such as Destiny's Child, rather than Beyoncé by herself. Houston Chronicles Joey Guerra felt that "Doubters of Beyoncé's immense talent need only give one listen to this track ['Resentment'] from 2006's B'Day. It's a stunner — a visceral, emotional showcase that casts Beyoncé as a scorned, sorrowful woman. You can almost feel the pain in her delivery." According to a writer of Irish Independent, the song gives a more soulful feel to B'Day. Jim Farber of Daily News called "Resentment" an "old-school soul shouter". Sasha Frere-Jones of The New Yorker described the song as a "fierce ballad". "Resentment" peaked at number 11 on the US Bubbling Under R&B/Hip-Hop Singles chart, which acts as an extension to the Hot R&B/Hip-Hop Songs.

Live performances
During Beyoncé's 2009 Las Vegas revue show, I Am... Yours, she performed the song live for the first time. Before performing the song, the singer described its meaning depth, stating: "How many of you have ever been lied to? I'm sure everyone has —we all have. But this next song is from my last album, B'Day. And I never performed this song before, this is especially for Encore[...] It talks about a relationship after you've been lied to. And you're trying your best to forgive. But it's difficult because you never forget. It's called 'Resentment'." She additionally included the song on the 2009 I Am... Yours: An Intimate Performance at Wynn Las Vegas as the ninth track of the DVD/CD's first disc. During a Thanksgiving TV Special, Beyoncé aired I Am... Yours in its entirety which also featured her performance of "Resentment". Nate Chinen of The New York Times said, "There's exactly one human-scale moment in the concert, when she sits at the lip of the stage to sing an acoustic treatment of 'Resentment,' from her album 'B'Day.' And even then she makes it a showstopper."

In May, 2012, Beyoncé performed "Resentment" as a part of her revue show Revel Presents: Beyoncé Live in Atlantic City, New Jersey, United States' entertainment resort, hotel, casino and spa, Revel. She announced it as her "favorite song" and according to Georgette Cline of The Boombox, "fans could feel the pangs of her once-broken heart on 'Resentment,' as she cooed of a lying lover who deceived her". Ben Ratliff of The New York Times mentioned "Resentment" in the "almost continuous high point" of the concert. A writer of the Associated Press, noted that Beyoncé "held back tears during a rousing rendition" of the song. According to Chuck Darrow of The Philadelphia Inquirer, the acoustic performance of the ballad, "proved a nice respite from the relentless thump-thump-thump of the many dance-pop numbers". Tris McCall from The Star-Ledger wrote that Beyoncé brought the song to life further describing the performance as a "full-scale psychological portrait in three and a half minutes". The live performance of the song during the concerts at Revel was used in Beyoncé's HBO documentary film, Life Is But a Dream (2013). Only one shot was used to film it for five minutes. Aaron Parsley from People magazine commented that the rendition of "Resentment" was "grittier and angrier" than the previous performances of the song. The song was also included on the set list of Beyoncé's The Mrs. Carter Show World Tour (2013), during several opening shows of the first leg where she performed it on a B-stage.

"Resentment" was performed during Beyoncé and Jay-Z's co-headlining On the Run Tour (2014). During the concert, Beyoncé moved to an island stage in the middle of the stadium, dressed as a bride in white with a floor-length bridal veil and performed the song seated. Video projections of the pair shooting at each other in an abandoned church, dressed in wedding attire followed as images of guns flashed across the screen with the words "this is not real". The footage ended with Beyoncé shooting Jay-Z dead. Kat Bein from the Miami New Times thought that the performance of the song was a "high note" during the concert. She also performed this song on Beyonce and Jay Z's second co-headlining On the Run II (2018).

Credits and personnel
Credits are taken from B'Day liner notes.

Written by: Beyoncé Knowles, Walter W. Millsap III, Candice Nelson, Curtis Mayfield
Produced by: Walter W. Millsap III and Beyoncé Knowles
Co-Produced by: Candice Nelson
Vocal Production by Beyoncé Knowles
All Music by: Walter W. Millsap III and Candice Nelson
Recorded by: Jim Caruana at Sony Music Studios, NYC
Assisted by: Rob Kinelski and Dave Lopez and Walter W. Millsap III at Lair Studios, Los Angeles, CA
Pro Tolls Editing by: Rob Kinelski and Walter W. Millsap III at Lair Studios, Los Angeles, CA
Mixed by: Jason Goldstein at Sony Music Studios, NYC
Assisted by: Steve Tolle
Contains Elements of "Think" (C. Mayfield)

References

2004 songs
2000s ballads
Rock ballads
Soul ballads
Victoria Beckham songs
Beyoncé songs
Songs written by Beyoncé
Songs written by Curtis Mayfield
Song recordings produced by Beyoncé
Songs written by Candice Nelson (songwriter)
Songs about infidelity